Gahluyeh (also Romanized as Gahlūyeh; also known as Gahlū, Kahlooyeh, and Kahlūyeh) is a village in Alamarvdasht Rural District, Alamarvdasht District, Lamerd County, Fars Province, Iran. At the 2006 census, its population was 202, in 38 families.

References 

Populated places in Lamerd County